Dadlu (also Romanized as Dādlū) is a village in Qezel Uzan Rural District of the Central District of Mianeh County, East Azerbaijan province, Iran. At the 2006 National Census, its population was 711 in 128 households. The following census in 2011 counted 760 people in 192 households. The latest census in 2016 showed a population of 658 people in 162 households; it was the largest village in its rural district.

References 

Meyaneh County

Populated places in East Azerbaijan Province

Populated places in Meyaneh County